Blake John Paul Murphy (born 18 February 2000) is an Irish multi-sportsperson. As a Gaelic footballer, he plays for Cork Championship club St Vincent's and at inter-county level with the Cork senior football team. He usually lines out as a forward.

Murphy has played basketball for Ireland and won an All-Ireland hurling title at Under-17 level. He played sparingly for UCC Demons of the Irish Super League during the 2018–19 season.

Honours

Cork
All-Ireland Under-20 Football Championship: 2019
Munster Under-20 Football Championship: 2019
All-Ireland Under-17 Hurling Championship: 2017
Munster Under-17 Hurling Championship: 2017 (c)

References

External link

Blake Murphy profile at the Cork GAA website

2000 births
Living people
St Vincent's (Cork) hurlers
St Vincent's (Cork) Gaelic footballers
CIT Gaelic footballers
Cork inter-county Gaelic footballers
Dual players